Natalia Kowalska (born 31 December 1989 in Koszalin) is a Polish racing driver.

Career
Kowalska started her career in Kart racing in Poland. In 2007, she moved to formula racing, driving a partial program in the Formula Renault 2.0 Northern European Cup. In 2008, she drove six races in the Star Mazda North American Championship. After a break in 2009, in 2010 she took part in the FIA Formula Two Championship. She continued in the championship in 2011.

Racing record

Career summary

Complete FIA Formula Two Championship results
(key) (Races in bold indicate pole position) (Races in italics indicate fastest lap)

References

External links
 Official website
 Career statistics from Driver Database

Polish racing drivers
1989 births
Living people
Formula Renault Eurocup drivers
Formula Renault 2.0 NEC drivers
Indy Pro 2000 Championship drivers
FIA Formula Two Championship drivers
People from Koszalin
Sportspeople from West Pomeranian Voivodeship
Polish female racing drivers